Beach soccer at the 2008 Asian Beach Games were held from 18 October to 26 October 2008 in Bali, Indonesia.

Medalists

Results

Preliminaries

Group A

Group B

Group C

Group D

Knockout round

Quarterfinals

Semifinals

3rd place

Final

References

External links
 Official website

2008 Asian Beach Games events
Beach
2008
2008
2008 in beach soccer